A by-election for the UK Parliament constituency of Perth and Kinross in Scotland was held on 25 May 1995, following the death of Conservative MP Sir Nicholas Fairbairn on 19 February of that year.

The result was a Scottish National Party gain from the Conservatives.

Results

Previous election

See also
Perth and Kinross (UK Parliament constituency)
Scottish Westminster constituencies
Lists of United Kingdom by-elections

References

External links
British Parliamentary By Elections: Campaign literature from the by-election

Perth and Kinross by-election
1990s elections in Scotland
Perth and Kinross by-election
Perth and Kinross by-election
By-elections to the Parliament of the United Kingdom in Scottish constituencies
Politics of Perth and Kinross